Meshari Al-Nemer (born 5 August 2003) is a Saudi Arabian professional footballer who plays as a striker for Pro League side Al-Nassr.

Club career
Al-Nemer began his career at the youth team of Al-Nassr. On 8 August 2021, he signed his first professional contract with the club. He made his debut on 27 June 2022 in the 2–1 win over Al-Fateh, replacing Vincent Aboubakar.

International career

Saudi Arabia U20
Meshari was part of the Saudi Arabia U20 in the Arab Cup in 2021, which was held in Egypt. On 24 June 2021 in the group stage match against Yemen, Al-Nemer scored the second goal in a 2–1 win. On 27 June 2021 in the final group stage match against Tunisia, Al-Nemer scored Saudi Arabia's only goal in a 2–1 defeat. In the quarter-finals match against Senegal, Al-Nemer saw his penalty saved in the penalty shoot-outs. Despite this, the Green Falcons qualified to the semi-finals after goalkeeper Osama Al-Mermesh saved Senegal's final penalty. In the final, Al-Nemer came off the bench in the 69th minute replacing Abdullah Radif as the Green Falcons defeated Algeria to win their first title.

Honours
Saudi Arabia U20
Arab Cup U-20: 2021

References

External links
 
 

2003 births
Living people
Association football forwards
Saudi Arabian footballers
Saudi Arabia youth international footballers
Al Nassr FC players
Saudi Professional League players